The 1977 VMI Keydets football team was an American football team that represented the Virginia Military Institute (VMI) as a member of the Southern Conference (SoCon) during the 1977 NCAA Division I football season. In their seventh year under head coach Bob Thalman, the team compiled an overall record of 7–4 with a mark of 4–1 in conference play, and tied for the SoCon championship.

Schedule

References

VMI
VMI Keydets football seasons
Southern Conference football champion seasons
VMI Keydets football